Osun United Football Club is a Nigerian football club, in the town of Osogbo, in Osun State.The club is also nicknamed Omoluabi Giants.

History 
Prime FC was founded 1996 by authorities of Osogbo Local Government  and play its home games in the 10,000 seater Oshogbo Stadium. They play in the second level of professional football in Nigeria, the Nigeria National League after relegation from the Nigeria Premier League in 2008. The club was renamed "Osun United" in January 2017 to give the club a better identity.

Controversy 
In October 2020, investigations were made into the financial dealings of the club in the wake of Odion Ighalo's loan move to Manchester United. Having started his career with the Omoluabi Giants, Osun United were paid €10,000 royalty for the striker's transfer.

Current squad

Former managers
 Samson Unuanel (2007–08)
 Ademola Adesina (2015–16)

Notable players
 Dare Ojo
 Odion Ighalo

Notes 

Football clubs in Nigeria
Osun State
1996 establishments in Nigeria
Sports clubs in Nigeria
Association football clubs established in 1996